Shahpur Jat is an urban village located near Hauz Khas, in the South Delhi district of Delhi, India.

History

When the Siri Fort was abandoned, Jats moved to the Shahpur Jat area, being attracted to the fertile lands.

Demography
Presently the demography of Shahpur Jat is made up mostly of Jats, Jatav (Tanwar`s) & Brahmins, Baniya and Valmiki are also residents of the village. In 1965, the land was acquired by Central Government to construct Asiad Village. Increasingly people from other places in India are moving into the urban village and also foreigners are attracted by the low rents, parking space, lifestyle, monuments and green belt.

Architecture

Shahpur Jat is a very old village featuring traditional havelis like DARAJIA POLI, SIRI FORT HAVELI and the remains of the historical capital city Siri Fort, such as the stretches of the thick city walls, all surrounded by 20th century apartment and office buildings. The area is currently undergoing urban greening and rejuvenation, partially due to the activities of local NGOs.

Startup Culture
Due to the exceptionally low rents in the area, and its proximity to the premier institutes like Jawaharlal Nehru University (JNU), Indian Institute of Technology, Delhi (IITD) and National Institute of Fashion Technology (NIFT), Shahpur Jat has attracted many startups and boutiques like KleverKid, Avanti, Holidify, Eckovation, Consure Medical, and Elucidata.

Travel
Near bus stop at Shahpur Jat is Khel Gao including Bus 500, 522A, etc. At Shahpur also head office of Fastbooktrip 
 Tanwar Jatavs
 Panwar Jats
 Siri Fort
 Bawana Fortress of Jat Zail
 1754 capture of Delhi by Jats

Notes

Neighbourhoods in Delhi
Villages in South Delhi district